The Honglujing Stele is a tablet 3 meters wide, 1.8 meters tall, & 2 meters thick. It has 29 Chinese characters written on it.

It is the only Tang dynasty stele found in Manchuria. It mentions the founding king of Balhae, King Go.

The stele is currently located in the Tokyo Imperial Palace. It was taken by the Japanese from the Chinese city of Lüshun in circa 1907 after the Russo-Japanese War. Chinese researchers are now studying it for the first time.

External links
 "1,300-year-old stele eyed by Chinese, Japanese archaeologists", article from The Peoples Daily, 1 June 2006

Art and cultural repatriation
Balhae
Tang dynasty art